Forever Yours (foaled 1933) was an American Thoroughbred racehorse retrospectively named the 1935 American Champion Two-Year-Old Filly. She was owned by Ethel Mars' Milky Way Farm Stable and trained by Robert McGarvey.

Among her wins in her Championship year, Forever Yours won the Arlington Lassie Stakes at Arlington Park in Chicago and the Spinaway Stakes at Saratoga Race Course in Saratoga Springs, New York.

References

1933 racehorse births
Thoroughbred family 14-b
Racehorses bred in the United States
Racehorses trained in the United States
American Champion racehorses